El caso Almería (English: The Almería Case) is a 1984 Spanish film directed by Pedro Costa Musté.

Plot 

The film tells the story of three men tortured and killed by Guardia Civil in 1981.

Cast 

 Agustín González-Mario Angular
 Fernando Guillén-Tte Coronel Gonzalez     Alarcon 
 Manuel Alexandre-Enrique
 Margarita Calahorra-Madre Luque
 Iñaki Miramón-Luis Trueba
 Pedro Díaz del Corral-Tte Luis Mendez
 Antonio Banderas-Juan Luque
 Juan Echanove-Luis Renedo

See also 
 List of Spanish films

External links 
 

1984 films
1984 thriller films
Spanish thriller films
1980s Spanish-language films
Thriller films based on actual events
Films set in Spain
Films shot in Almería
1980s Spanish films